Perdicium is a genus of African plants in the tribe Mutisieae within the family Asteraceae.

 Species
Several dozen species have at one time been considered members of Perdicium. Almost all of them are now regarded as better suited to other genera (Acourtia Ainsliaea Chaptalia Gerbera Haplocarpha Holocheilus Leibnitzia Leucheria Perezia Trixis). Only two remain:
 Perdicium capense L. - South Africa
 Perdicium leiocarpum DC. - South Africa

References

Asteraceae genera
Mutisieae
Endemic flora of South Africa